Josh Kerr may refer to:

Josh Kerr (rugby league) (born 1996), Australian rugby league player
Josh Kerr (runner) (born 1997), Scottish middle-distance runner